Jean-Marc Holder (born 2 September 1962) is a Trinidad and Tobago sailor. He competed in the Finn event at the 1984 Summer Olympics.

References

External links
 

1962 births
Living people
Trinidad and Tobago male sailors (sport)
Olympic sailors of Trinidad and Tobago
Sailors at the 1984 Summer Olympics – Finn
Sportspeople from Port of Spain